U-Catastrophe is the third album by British-Canadian musician and singer-songwriter Simon Collins, son of Phil Collins. Phil plays on the track "The Big Bang", while another former Genesis member, Steve Hackett, plays on the track "Fast Forward the Future". It was first digitally available in August 2008 on iTunes.

Production
While recording a cover of the 1981 Genesis song "Keep It Dark" in 2007, Collins met Canadian record producer Kevin Churko.  As a result of the meeting, they decided to produce Collins' next album together.  That same year Collins signed with the record label Razor & Tie.  Work began on the album in September 2007, finishing in February 2008.

Theme and highlights
Collins recounts that much of the album as well as the album's title were inspired by events in his own life, stating, "I went through some hard times a couple years ago and I had to find a way back to love and a way back to living a life that I knew was healthy for me. There were certain things I felt a need to sing about, so a lot of these songs were inspired by my own personal u-catastrophe.". "Us (Love Transcends)" is according to Collins "one of the most personal songs on the record" and was written for his partner and stepdaughter.  Collins has also related that songs on the album such as "Disappearing" and "Eco" are his response to the global warming issue: "I know everyone's sick of hearing about it but it's not gonna go away."

Collins' father, Phil Collins, appears on the track "The Big Bang" in a drum duet between the two. Former Genesis guitarist Steve Hackett contributed to the final track, "Fast Forward the Future".

Reception
Musicplayers.com wrote in their review of the album, "There is definite greatness here. On the drumming front, Simon shares style and tone with his dad, but he goes far more in a modern rock direction with programming electronic beats and grooves."

The album's first single "Unconditional" reached the Canadian Hot 100 in November 2008.

Track listing

Personnel 
 Simon Collins – vocals, keyboards (1-6, 8-12), acoustic piano (1, 5, 6, 9, 10), sound design (1-6, 8-12), drums (1, 2, 4-9), guitars (3), sampler (9), additional guitars (11), drum programming (12)
 Dave Kerzner – additional keyboards (1, 6), sound design (1, 3, 4, 6, 8), keyboards (3, 4, 8)
 Brian Dillman – sound design (4), additional sound design (6, 9)
 Debora Lucyk – sampler (9), additional sound design (9), backing vocals (9), chanting (9)
 Kevin Churko – guitars, bass, backing vocals (1-7, 9-12), keyboards (3-10), drum programming (3, 12), strings (9), drums (11)
 Kelly Nordstrom – guitars (1, 6, 8, 10, 11, 12), additional guitars (2-5, 9)
 Steve Hackett – guitar solo (12)
 Phil Collins – drums (8)

Production 
 Simon Collins – producer 
 Kevin Churko – producer, recording, mixing, mastering
 Michael Caplan – A&R 
 Greg Martin – artwork, design 
 Joseph Cultice – photography 
 Alan Wolmark – management 
 Recorded at Kung Fu Studios (Las Vegas, Nevada, USA) and MAP Studios (Twickenham, England, UK).
 Mixed at Kung Fu Studios
 Mastered at Armoury Studios (Vancouver, British Columbia, Canada).

See also
 Sound of Contact
 Dimensionaut

References

External links
 Simon Collins' at MySpace
 [ U-Catastrophe] on Allmusic

2008 albums
Albums produced by Kevin Churko
Simon Collins albums
Razor & Tie albums